Battle of Rautu can refer to:

 Battle of Rautu (1656), battle of the Russo-Swedish War (1656–58)
 Battle of Rautu (1918), battle of the Finnish Civil War